Henry Russell may refer to:

 Henry Russell (musician) (1812/13–1900), English pianist, baritone singer and composer
 Henry Russell (impresario) (1871–1937), English impresario, conductor, and singing teacher
 Sir Henry Russell, 1st Baronet (1751–1836), British judge in India
 Sir Henry Russell, 2nd Baronet (1783–1852), British 'Resident' at the court of Hyderabad in India
 Henry Russell (explorer) (1834–1909), Irish mountaineer, Pyrenean explorer and eccentric
 Henry Chamberlain Russell (1836–1907), Australian astronomer and meteorologist
 Henry Norris Russell (1877–1957), American astronomer, developer of Hertzsprung-Russell diagram (1910)
 Henry Russell (athlete) (1904–1986), American gold medal winner in 1928 Amsterdam 4 × 100 m relay 
 Henry Russell, Marquess of Tavistock (born 2005), Henry Robin Charles Russell; heir apparent of Andrew Russell, Duke of Bedford
 Henry Russell (politician) (1817–1891), New Zealand runholder and politician
 Henry P. Russell (1878–1956), American Medal of Honor recipient
 Henry S. Russell (1838–1905), American military and government official
 Henry Stuart Russell (1818–1889), explorer, politician and pastoralist
 Henry Vane Russell (1809–1846), English cricketer
 Ken Russell (Henry Kenneth Alfred Russell, 1927–2011), English film director

See also
 Henry-Russell Hitchcock (1903–1987), American architectural historian